Jaílton Lourenço da Silva, known as Jaílton Paraíba, is a professional Brazilian football player who plays as a winger and forward for  Sabah FC in Malaysia Super League

Career 
In 2012, Jaílton Paraíba joined Chinese club Shanghai Shenxin in the Chinese Super League. He scored his first goal against Henan Jinaye on 17 March. He displayed impressive speed and dribble during the 3 seasons with the team.

On 7 February 2015, Jaílton Paraíba joined Yanbian Changbaishan in the China League One. He helped Yanbian win the 2015 China League One to promote into the Chinese Super League.

On 26 January 2016, Jaílton Paraíba joined Dalian Transcendence. However, he left the team in May 2017 and terminated the contract, as the team did not pay his salary.

On 26 August 2017, he moved to Turkish club Gençlerbirliği S.K.

On 25 August 2019, Tokyo Verdy signed with Jaílton Paraíba.

Honours
Yanbian Changbaishan 
 China League One: 2015

References

External links
 

1990 births
Living people
Brazilian footballers
Brazilian expatriate footballers
União São João Esporte Clube players
Clube do Remo players
Mogi Mirim Esporte Clube players
Clube de Regatas Brasil players
Shanghai Shenxin F.C. players
Yanbian Funde F.C. players
Dalian Transcendence F.C. players
Gençlerbirliği S.K. footballers
Tokyo Verdy players
Association football forwards
Chinese Super League players
China League One players
Süper Lig players
J2 League players
Expatriate footballers in China
Brazilian expatriate sportspeople in China
Expatriate footballers in Japan
Brazilian expatriate sportspeople in Japan